is a passenger railway station in located in the city of Habikino,  Osaka Prefecture, Japan, operated by the private railway operator Kintetsu Railway.

Lines
Eganoshō Station is served by the Minami Osaka Line, and is located 11.6 rail kilometers from the starting point of the line at Ōsaka Abenobashi Station.

Station layout
The station was consists of two opposed side platforms. There is no connection between platforms, and passengers wishing to change platforms must exit the station, cross by a level crossing, and reenter. The station is unattended.

Platforms

Adjacent stations

History
Eganoshō Station opened on June 1, 1924.

Passenger statistics
In fiscal 2019, the station was used by an average of 10,677 passengers daily.

Surrounding area
Yoshimura Family Residence (National Important Cultural Property)
Otsukayama Kofun
Osaka Prefectural Otsuka High School
Habikino City Eganosho Elementary School
Habikino City Takawashi Elementary School

See also
List of railway stations in Japan

References

External links

 Kintetsu: Eganoshō Station 

Railway stations in Japan opened in 1924
Railway stations in Osaka Prefecture
Habikino